Erica Yayra Nego (born  in Minneapolis, Minnesota) is a beauty queen, model, and businesswoman. She was elected Miss Minnesota USA in 2009 and Miss Universe Ghana in 2011,

Nego is the co-founder of Style & Grace, a Minneapolis-based etiquette academy.

Early life
Nego was born in 1984 in Minneapolis, Minnesota. At the age of 12, she was signed to Ford Modeling Agency. She is of Ghanaian, German and Persian ancestry.

Pageants
As Miss Minnesota USA 2009, Nego competed at Miss USA 2009 placing in the top 15 at the competition. She also competed at Miss Universe 2011 in São Paulo, Brazil on September 12, 2011.

In popular culture
The play School Girls; Or, the African Mean Girls Play by Jocelyn Bioh was inspired by the 2011 Miss Universe Ghana competition in which Nego participated, and the controversy around colorism that this contest sparked.

References

1984 births
Living people

People from Minneapolis
Ghanaian beauty pageant contestants
American beauty pageant contestants
Miss Universe Ghana winners
Miss USA 2009 delegates
Miss Universe 2011 contestants
Ghanaian people of German descent
Ghanaian people of Iranian descent
American people of Ghanaian descent
American people of German descent
American people of Iranian descent
Ewe people